Listeria thailandensis is a species of bacteria. It is a Gram-positive, facultatively anaerobic, non-motile, non-spore-forming bacillus. It is non-pathongenic and non-hemolytic. It was isolated from a fried chicken sample from Thailand. The species was first proposed in 2019, and the species name refers to the country from which it was first isolated.

The optimum growth temperature for L. thailandensis is 30-37 °C and can grow in the 22-42 °C range.

References

thailandensis
Bacteria described in 2019